Leizhou is a county-level city in Guangdong Province, China. It is under the jurisdiction of the prefecture-level city of Zhanjiang.

The city was formerly known as Haikang County (postal: Hoihong); it was upgraded into a city in 1994.

Geography
Leizhou is located at the extreme southwestern end of Guangdong and lies on the Leizhou Peninsula.

Transportation 
China National Highway 207

Climate

Notable People 

 Mạc Cửu (1655–1731): Founder of the  Principality of Hà Tiên.

See also
 Leizhou dialect

References

 
County-level cities in Guangdong
Zhanjiang